Eganelisib (USAN), codenamed IPI-549, is an experimental drug being investigated as a possible treatment for cancer. It is a highly selective phosphoinositide 3-kinase inhibitor, and thus works by inhibiting the enzyme PIK3CG, disrupting the PI3K/AKT/mTOR signaling pathway which plays important roles in the development of cancer.

Eganelisib is being developed by Infinity Pharmaceuticals. Early clinical trial results were published in September 2016. On September 29, 2020, it was granted Fast Track designation by the United States Food and Drug Administration (FDA) as a treatment for inoperable, locally advanced, or metastatic triple-negative breast cancer, combined with a checkpoint inhibitor and chemotherapy.

, five phase I/II clinical trials were ongoing in the United States, and one in Europe.

References

Further reading

Antineoplastic drugs
Experimental drugs
Phosphoinositide 3-kinase inhibitors
Pyrazoles
Amines
Amides
Pyrimidines